The Bargello, also known as the Palazzo del Bargello, Museo Nazionale del Bargello, or Palazzo del Popolo (Palace of the People), was a former barracks and prison, now an art museum, in Florence, Italy.

Terminology
The word bargello appears to come from the late Latin bargillus (from Gothic bargi and German burg), meaning "castle" or "fortified tower". During the Italian Middle Ages it was the name given to a military captain in charge of keeping peace and justice (hence "Captain of justice") during riots and uproars. In Florence he was usually hired from a foreign city to prevent any appearance of favoritism on the part of the Captain. The position could be compared with that of a current Chief of police. The name Bargello was extended to the building which was the office of the captain.

The palace

Construction began in 1255. The palace was built to house first the Capitano del Popolo and later, in 1261, the 'podestà', the highest magistrate of the Florence City Council. This Palazzo del Podestà, as it was originally called, is the oldest public building in Florence. This austere crenellated building served as model for the construction of the Palazzo Vecchio. In 1574, the Medici dispensed with the function of the Podestà and housed the bargello, the police chief of Florence, in this building, hence its name. It was employed as a prison; executions took place in the Bargello's yard until they were abolished by Grand Duke Peter Leopold in 1786, but it remained the headquarters of the Florentine police until 1859. When Leopold II, Holy Roman Emperor Peter Leopold was exiled, the makeshift Governor of Tuscany decided that the Bargello should no longer be a jail, and it then became a national museum.

The original two-story structure was built alongside the Volognana Tower in 1256. The third storey, which can be identified by the smaller blocks used to construct it, was added after the fire of 1323.  The building is designed around an open courtyard with an external staircase leading to the second floor. An open well is found in the centre of the courtyard.

The Bargello opened as a national museum (Museo Nazionale del Bargello) in 1865, displaying the largest Italian collection of gothic and Renaissance sculptures (14–17th century).

Art collection
The museum houses masterpieces by Michelangelo, such as his Bacchus, Pitti Tondo (or Madonna and Child), Brutus and David-Apollo. Its collection includes Donatello's David, Amore-Attis and St. George Tabernacle
, Vincenzo Gemito's Pescatore ("fisherboy"),  Jacopo Sansovino's Bacchus, Giambologna's Architecture and his Mercury and many works from the Della Robbia family. Benvenuto Cellini is represented with his bronze bust of Cosimo I. There are a few works from the Baroque period, notably Gianlorenzo Bernini's 1636-7 Bust of Costanza Bonarelli.

The museum also has a fine collection of ceramics (maiolica), textile, tapestries, ivory, silver, armour and coins. The formerly lost right-hand panel of the Franks Casket is held by the museum. It also features the competing designs for The Sacrifice of Isaac (Sacrificio di Isacco) that were made by Lorenzo Ghiberti and Filippo Brunelleschi to win the contest for the second set of doors of the Florence Baptistery (1401).

Honolulu Hale's interior courtyard, staircase, and open ceiling were modeled after the Bargello.

The Islamic Hall at the Bargello was set up in 1982 by Marco Spallanzani and Giovanni Curatola at the direction of Paola Barocchi and Giovanna Gaeta Bertelà, then the director.

Gallery

See also
 Museums of Florence

References

External links

 

 
Palaces in Florence
Gothic architecture in Florence
1865 establishments in Italy
Art museums established in 1865
Sculpture galleries in Italy